Secret Wars is a 2004 album by Oneida.

Track listing
"Treasure Plane"
"Caesar's Column"
"Capt. Bo Dignifies the Allegations with a Response"
"Wild Horses"
"$50 Tea"
"The Last Act, Every Time"
"The Winter Shaker"
"Changes in the City"

References

2004 albums
Oneida (band) albums
Jagjaguwar albums
Rough Trade Records albums
Three Gut Records albums